The Primera División, or Liga Venezolana is the top-flight professional football league of Venezuela. It was created in 1921 and turned professional in 1957. It is organized by the Federación Venezolana de Fútbol.

Format

Starting in the 2020 season, the 20 teams play in a home-and-away round-robin tournament, with the top eight teams advancing to the semi-final stage.

In the semi-final stage, the eight teams are divided in two groups of four teams each, facing the other teams in their group twice. The two group winners will advance to the Serie Final to decide the league champions.

International qualification

The champions and runners-up qualify to the group phase of the Copa Libertadores.
The team with the most points in the entire season qualifies to the preliminary round of the Copa Libertadores as Venezuela 3.
The second and third team with the most points in the entire season qualifies to the Copa Sudamericana as Venezuela 1 and Venezuela 2.
If a team won both tournaments that team qualify to the Copa Libertadores as Venezuela 1, then the first and second team with the most points in the entire season qualify to the Copa Libertadores as Venezuela 2 and Venezuela 3 and the fourth and fifth team with the most points in the entire season qualify to the Copa Sudamericana as Venezuela 1 and Venezuela 2.
If the winner of the Copa Venezuela does not qualify to the Copa Libertadores through the aforementioned manners or through the point total in the entire season, they take the Venezuela 2 spot in the Copa Sudamericana.

Relegation
The two lowest placed teams in the entire season are automatically relegated to the Segunda División.

2023 teams

List of champions
List of champions since the first championship held in 1920. The Primera División turned professional on 21 February 1957.

Amateur era (1921–1956)

Professional era (1957–present)

Titles by club
Clubs in bold compete in Primera División as of the current season. Clubs in italic no longer exist.

See also
Venezuelan football league system

References

External links
  
 News in Spanish about the First Division of the Venezuelan Football/Soccer
 News and pictures in Spanish
 League statistics at RSSSF
 FuriaVinotinto - Unofficial Forum  

 
1
Top level football leagues of South America
Sports leagues established in 1921